The Victorville shoulderband (Helminthoglypta mohaveana)  is a species of land snail in the family Helminthoglyptidae.

It is endemic to California in the Western United States.

It is known only from the Mojave Desert near Victorville in San Bernardino County.

References

External links

Helminthoglypta
Endemic fauna of California
Fauna of the Mojave Desert
Natural history of San Bernardino County, California
Molluscs of the United States
Victorville, California
Gastropods described in 1927
Taxonomy articles created by Polbot